Koryak Okrug (Koryak: , Cav’cәvaokrug), or Koryakia, is an administrative division of Kamchatka Krai, Russia. It was a federal subject of Russia (an autonomous okrug of Kamchatka Oblast) from 1931 until July 1, 2007, when it merged with Kamchatka Oblast. Prior to the merger, it was called Koryak Autonomous Okrug. Its administrative center is the urban locality (an urban-type settlement) of Palana. Population:

Demographics
As of the 2002 Census, Koryaks constituted about a quarter of the population.

Vital statistics

Ethnic groups
About 40% of the total population is indigenous, the Koryaks being the largest such group. They are, however, outnumbered by the ethnic Russians.

2006 earthquake

On April 20, 2006, Kamchatka Peninsula was struck by a major earthquake. The 7.7-magnitude tremor had its epicenter near the village of Tilichiki. The Koryakia branch of the Ministry of Emergency Situations said some area residents were injured but there were no fatalities.

The quake occurred at about noon local time Friday, so residents were awake and not caught in their beds.

The United States Geological Survey reported a series of at least fifty smaller aftershocks in the area and immediately offshore. They ranged from 4.1 to 6.5 magnitudes on the Richter scale.

Bruce Presgrave, a geophysicist with the U.S.G.S. in Colorado, said the quake was relatively shallow. He estimated that about 2,000 people live close enough to the epicenter to have felt its full force.

See also
 Machevna Bay

References

Notes

Sources
Chaussonnet, Valerie (1995) Native Cultures of Alaska and Siberia. Arctic Studies Center. Washington, D.C. 112p. 

Former federal subjects of Russia
Politics of the Koryak Autonomous Okrug
Geography of Kamchatka Krai
History of the Kamchatka Peninsula
Kamchatka Krai
States and territories established in 1931
Russian-speaking countries and territories